Andray Baptiste (born 15 April 1977) is a Grenadian international footballer who plays as a goalkeeper.

He played for English side Harrow Borough, Police SC and London Benfica. He also spend some time at Ashford Town on dual forms whilst at Harrow Borough.

References

External links
Caribbean Football Database

1977 births
Living people
Grenadian footballers
Association football goalkeepers
Harrow Borough F.C. players
Ashford Town (Middlesex) F.C. players
Grenada international footballers
2009 CONCACAF Gold Cup players
2011 CONCACAF Gold Cup players
Grenadian expatriate footballers
Grenadian expatriate sportspeople in England
Expatriate footballers in England